Marco Perini (born 19 March 1985) is an Italian footballer who plays for ASD Città di Sangiuliano.

Career
In the summer 2019, Perini joined ASD Città di Sangiuliano both as a player and youth coach.

Honours

Club 
 Monza
Serie D: 2016-17
Scudetto Dilettanti: 2016-17

References

External links 
 
 

1985 births
Living people
Italian footballers
Association football midfielders
U.S. Pergolettese 1932 players
U.S. 1913 Seregno Calcio players
A.C. Carpi players
A.C. Bellaria Igea Marina players
F.C. Grosseto S.S.D. players
A.C. Monza players
A.C. Renate players
U.C. AlbinoLeffe players
Serie C players
Serie D players
People from Brianza
A.S.D. La Biellese players
Footballers from Lombardy